"The Motor Bus" is a macaronic poem written in 1914 by Alfred Denis Godley (1856–1925).

The mixed English-Latin text makes fun of the difficulties of Latin declensions. It takes off from puns on the English words "motor" and "bus", ascribing them to the third and second declensions respectively in Latin, and declining them.

At the time of writing Godley, a distinguished Classical scholar, was Public Orator at the University of Oxford. The poem commemorates the introduction of a motorised omnibus service in the city of Oxford. Corn and High are the colloquial names of streets in the centre of the city; several Colleges of the University are located in High Street. The poem has since been cited in the context of the recent introduction of larger vehicles (including "bendy" buses).

The poem may owe its continued popularity to the large number of pupils who formerly had to learn Latin as a compulsory subject for University entrance exams (not just for Oxford and Cambridge) in the United Kingdom.  Most of them will have used a primer in which Latin nouns were declined; for example, servus, serve, servum, servi, servo, servo (depending upon the order in which Latin's six cases—nominative, vocative, accusative, genitive, dative, ablative—were listed). The poem provided interest to what was a very dry subject for most school pupils.

The poem's rhymes assume that the Latin words are read using the traditional English pronunciation, which was taught in British (and American) schools until well into the 20th century.

Text
Following each repetition of the phrase "Motor Bus" is the Latin number and case of the words in the original poem.

Citations

The poem is quoted by Dorothy L. Sayers in her essay "The greatest single defect of my own Latin education" and other texts.

Herbert H. Huxley dedicated to A. D. Godley his short Latin poem "Mars Bar":

Est praedulcis esu Mars-Bar.
Nil est cibo tuo, Mars, par.
Tune vis beatum larem?
Habe promptum Martem-Barem.
Captus dono Martis-Baris
Helenam liquisset Paris.
Dum natabunt ponto scari,
Dentur laudes Marti-Bari!

Version of Motor Bus 2022

In April 2022 a new version of Godley's Motor Bus, using less Anglicised pronunciation of Latin and adopting a more positive approach to the motor bus, was proposed by classicist Armand D'Angour. Alternative phrases in English that scan in place of the Latin are given in square brackets.

Make a trip without a fuss:
What is best? The Motor Bus.
Train or car is not our way:
te amamus [we just love you], Motor Be!
Bicycles may work for some:
poscimus [we demand] Motorem Bum;
amor – for Love is the key –
implet nos [fills our hearts] Motoris Bi;
let us offer praise and glory
excellenti [to the splendid] Bo Motori:
think ‘what fun!’, before we go,
vehi [riding] in Motore Bo.

At the ready stand, we see,
candentes [shining bright] Motores Bi.
(You would tell, I’m sure, some stories,
if you could, O Bi Motores);
many others stationed close
videmus [we observe] Motores Bos.
We admire the decorum
omnium [of all these] Motorum Borum.
Fortunate are those like us
usi [who use] Bis Motoribus!

See also
Carmen Possum
Dog Latin

References

English poems
1914 poems
Latin language
Buses in fiction
Macaronic language